Joseph Martin Hood (born 1942) is a senior United States district judge of the United States District Court for the Eastern District of Kentucky.

Education and career

Born in Ashland, Kentucky, Hood received a Bachelor of Science degree from the University of Kentucky in 1965 and a Juris Doctor from the University of Kentucky College of Law in 1972. He was in the United States Army Captain from 1966 to 1970. He was a law clerk to Judge Howard David Hermansdorfer of the United States District Court for the Eastern District of Kentucky from 1972 to 1976, and was then a United States magistrate judge for the same court from 1976 to 1990.

Federal judicial service

On January 24, 1990, Hood was nominated by President George H. W. Bush to a seat on the United States District Court for the Eastern District of Kentucky vacated by Judge Scott Elgin Reed. Hood was confirmed by the United States Senate on April 27, 1990, and received his commission on April 30, 1990. He served as Chief Judge from 2005 to 2007, assuming senior status on October 14, 2007. He has been a member of the Judicial Conference of the United States since 2016.

References

Sources

1942 births
Living people
Judges of the United States District Court for the Eastern District of Kentucky
United States district court judges appointed by George H. W. Bush
20th-century American judges
University of Kentucky College of Law alumni
United States Army officers
United States magistrate judges
People from Ashland, Kentucky
21st-century American judges